Banff Trail station is a CTrain light rail station in Banff Trail, Calgary, Alberta,  Canada. It serves the Northwest Line (Route 201) and opened on September 7, 1987, as part of the original line. It is located on the exclusive LRT right of way on the east side of Banff Trail NW, 4.1 km northwest of the 7 Avenue & 9 Street SW interlocking. The station consists of two side-loading platforms with grade-level access from a pedestrian crossing of the tracks at the northern end of the station.

The station is also located east of the McMahon Stadium (which features 780 spaces available for commuters), and the Motel Village district, and north-east of the junction of Crowchild Trail and the Trans-Canada Highway.

As part of Calgary Transit's plan to operate four-car CTrains by the end of 2014, all three-car platforms were to be extended. However, Banff Trail Station was also refurbished in addition to a platform extension. Construction began in early 2014 and continued into Winter 2014–2015. This refurbishment required an extended closure of the station.

The overhaul was completed December 21, 2014. It features new LED lighting, 16 HD security cameras, heated shelters and a much more user friendly, safer contemporary feel.

In 2008, Banff Trail Station registered 5,600 weekday boardings.

References

CTrain stations
Railway stations in Canada opened in 1987
1987 establishments in Alberta